Lemoore (formerly, La Tache and Lee Moore's) is a city in Kings County, California, United States. It is part of the Hanford-Corcoran Metropolitan Statistical Area (MSA Code 25260). The population was 24,531 at the 2010 Census. The California Department of Finance estimated that Lemoore's population was 26,725 on July 1, 2019.

Lemoore is home to Naval Air Station Lemoore, a master jet base housing F-18 and F-35 squadrons assigned to the Pacific fleet.

History
Dr. Lovern Lee Moore first made his home in what was western Tulare County, California—now the City of Lemoore—in April, 1871. It was on the northern shoreline (just above the high-water mark) of Tulare Lake, then potentially the largest freshwater body of water in the US, outside of the Great Lakes. The American pioneers from eastern states saw this as a stretch of vast virgin land on which sheep, horses and wild animals had grazed but had never been cultivated.

By the time Dr. Moore arrived, scores of individual farms dotted the landscape, but as Tulare Lake retreated, more became continually available. The soil was rich and productive as it had been brought down and deposited for centuries from the high Sierras by the Kings River and the Los Gatos Creek alluvial fan from the Coast Range. Wells were easy to dig, as the water level was unusually high. So water was plentiful for irrigation from shallow wells farm families installed. Raising of sheep and grains were principal concerns of farmers in the area.

It was even farther to Kingston for other supplies. Hanford was not founded until later in 1877. Even the area was called by various names, believed to be of Indian origin, such as Latache, Tailholt, or just, in English, the Lake District.

Dr. Lee Moore proved to be a man of vision. He decided to knit together the scores of surrounding farm families, to secure a post office, and some local center for conducting business which could be hastened by direct means of communicating with the outside world. He must also have had the hope of attracting the railroad, which was then being planned but was not built until six years later.

The first steps he took to organize a community began in early 1872, when he surveyed a  subdivision in what is now the land immediately west of the present Lemoore High School. In August 1872 he had established the first real estate development in this district and had laid out and named the streets after other pioneer families. In the summer of 1872 land auctions were held and lots went to the highest bidder. Prices ranged from $75 to $150 per lot. One business lot was sold for $600, rated as a very high price, considering the value of the dollar in 1872. Dr. Moore's home was believed to be situated where the grammar school playground on Bush Street is now located.

The year 1872 was a busy one for the inhabitants. In addition to sales at the subdivision and putting in of streets, new buildings for homes and businesses began to arise. This was the start of a real community, but it still lacked a school, a definitely accepted name, and a post office.

All these developed in the next eventful year of 1873. Dr. Moore had presented a signed petition to the U.S. Post Office Department in distant Washington for a post office in the new town in 1872, but his petition was not granted until 1873.

At that time it was common custom to name communities after their founders or some prominent person of the day. The naming of Hanford and Porterville are examples of this common practice.

The Lemoore post office first opened in 1875.

For some reason the U.S. Post Office objected to the name "Latache," so, by about the 1920s it combined the founder's name by omitting one letter "e",from Lee and called the new post office Lemoore after Lee Moore. In that way the new community received its new name.

In the same year, 1873, a Mr. Armstrong donated  of land for the first school building in Lemoore.

The railroad came to what is now Kings County in 1877. At that date Grangeville was the largest community in the entire area. After some dispute with its residents, rail officials decided to by-pass that settlement and went through Hanford. Lemoore, by that time had shown healthy growth. It could have been through the foresight of Dr. Moore in setting a head-start in '72 which attracted the rail route to his budding community. The line was put through Lemoore in 1877 parallel to Front Street, now called E Street.

This re-directed the business growth of the town toward the railroad station from where Dr. Moore first encouraged residence and business activity. It eventually made E (Front Street) and D Streets the main business avenues of the community.

After 25 years of service to the Lemoore area, Dr. Lee Moore died on September 11, 1898. The number of new residents he had helped bring into the world numbered in the thousands.

In 1883 the town then had a flouring mill of 200 barrels daily capacity. It was an important shipping point for wheat and wool, and not long afterwards became a center for fruit, but in its early period many fires retarded its growth.

Many of the early settlers of the Lemoore District were cultured people, and Lemoore attained a reputation for literary and musical accomplishments unmatched by many pioneer towns. There was an early literary society that had a long and noteworthy existence.

In 1893 Tulare County, by act of the State Legislature, was split into two areas. Western Tulare County became what is now Kings County. In creating the new County of Kings there was keen competition between Hanford and Lemoore as to which would become the county seat. By that time Hanford's population had exceeded Lemoore's and the addition of the Santa Fe Railroad's main line through Hanford gave it the advantage of two rail lines instead of one. The result was the construction of the County Courthouse in that city.

Lemoore became an incorporated city on 4 July 1900, which opened a new era for the community, with government by an elected City Council. Lemoore residents have always taken a keen interest in local political activities.

Bob E. Baldock designed and opened for play in 1928 a 9-hole golf course. The City of Lemoore had it remodeled in 1991, by Bill Phillips to add to the community an exciting 18-hole golf course.

Military

In 1941, the Lemoore Army Air Field opened as an Army Air Forces training field. The Federal Government acquired  for the Lemoore Basic Flying School in 1941–42. In 1961, The Army Air Field was converted into what is now Naval Air Station Lemoore, a Naval Aviation base 7 miles west of Lemoore. Since 1961, The base has grown to become the largest Master Jet Base in the Navy. NAS Lemoore hosts five carrier air wings, mostly made up of F-18s and F-35 jets.

Geography
The maps published by Thos. H. Thompson in 1892, shows three high water levels of the giant Tulare Lake in different years. The highest lake level, the one Thompson labeled "original lake line" skirts or touches the 1892 town of Lemoore's south-west corner at the current intersection of State Route 41 and State Route 198. On Thompson's map, Lemoore is on the east bank, and about five miles away Lemoore Naval Air Station would have been on the west bank of the pointy northern tip of Tulare Lake at its maximum size.  At the extreme northern point of Tulare Lake was its natural, occasional "flood year" spillway northbound into Bogg Slough, Fresno Slough, and the San Joaquin River's watershed, onward to the sea at San Francisco Bay. The present (2014) remaining marshy remnants of Bogg Slough, with its unfarmed oxbow structures may be the last of their kind to avoid the plow in the Kings-San Joaquin river system.  This "summit," or spillway is located just a few miles north-west of Lemoore, off Grangeville Blvd at elevation . The spillway was wide, shallow and confusing, choked with tall tule rushes, and without observable landmarks. Only one commercial boat is known to have sailed from Tulare Lake to the San Francisco delta.  Tulare Lake had huge economic importance in the region, both for the very large population of Indians, and the white pioneers.  The lake supported a large commercial fishery feeding San Francisco, and a steam powered ferry servicing several towns and settlements.  The receding lake continually opened up new agricultural lands for settlement.  Because of its source streams being diverted, the last time the lake overflowed was 1878, and today it no longer exists.

Because the natural summit or border between the Kings River basin and the San Joaquin River's watershed, and the Kings River itself nearly intersect near Lemoore, a number of huge water works that control regional water flow are also located nearby.  For example, in flood years the Kings River is diverted west into the so-called "North Fork Kings River," to Crescent Weir and related major levees eastward to the north-flowing Fresno Slough and to the sea, preventing a resurgence ("flooding") of Tulare Lake to the south. This "switch point" is located just north of Lemoore right off of Highway 41 and Elgin Ave at the New Island Weirs.  In many cases the prehistoric Kings River bed has been obliterated and new channels have been constructed. However, as of 2014, in satellite images (such as Google maps, etc.) the remains of many of the old channels can still be detected.

Other towns built just above the Tulare Lake high-water shoreline include Kettleman City and Alpaugh (once also called Hog Island, Root Island, and Atwell's Island). Satellite maps indicate that highways, railroads, and property lines are aligned with the historic lake shores. Also, many of the farms can be seen to be much larger within its various historic shore lines than in the surrounding areas.

Climate
According to the Köppen Climate Classification system, Lemoore has a semi-arid climate, abbreviated "BSk" on climate maps.

Demographics

2010
The 2010 United States Census reported that Lemoore had a population of 24,531. The racial makeup of Lemoore was 13,925 (56.8%) White, 1,566 (6.4%) African American, 333 (1.4%) Native American, 2,010 (8.2%) Asian, 102 (0.4%) Pacific Islander, 4,935 (20.1%) from other races, and 1,660 (6.8%) from two or more races. Hispanic or Latino of any race were 9,820 persons (40.0%).

The Census reported that 24,514 people (99.9% of the population) lived in households, 11 (0%) lived in non-institutionalized group quarters, and 6 (0%) were institutionalized.

There were 8,196 households, out of which 3,787 (46.2%) had children under the age of 18 living in them, 4,076 (49.7%) were opposite-sex married couples living together, 1,387 (16.9%) had a female householder with no husband present, 607 (7.4%) had a male householder with no wife present.  There were 641 (7.8%) unmarried opposite-sex partnerships, and 44 (0.5%) same-sex married couples or partnerships. 1,532 households (18.7%) were made up of individuals, and 436 (5.3%) had someone living alone who was 65 years of age or older. The average household size was 2.99.  There were 6,070 families (74.1% of all households); the average family size was 3.42.

The population was spread out, with 7,547 people (30.8%) under the age of 18, 3,053 people (12.4%) aged 18 to 24, 7,184 people (29.3%) aged 25 to 44, 4,955 people (20.2%) aged 45 to 64, and 1,792 people (7.3%) who were 65 years of age or older.  The median age was 28.6 years. For every 100 females, there were 99.1 males.  For every 100 females age 18 and over, there were 95.4 males.

The homeowner vacancy rate was 2.0%; the rental vacancy rate was 5.1%.  13,562 people (55.3% of the population) lived in owner-occupied housing units and 10,952 people (44.6%) lived in rental housing units.

The 2018 American Community Survey estimated that 17.2% of the population lived below the poverty line.

2000
As of the census of 2000, there were 21,900 people, 6,450 households, and 4,927 families residing in the city. The racial makeup of the city was 59.29% White, 7.28% African American, 1.59% Native American, 8.37% Asian, 0.33% Pacific Islander, 17.35% from other races, and 5.80% from two or more races. Hispanic or Latino of any race were 30.50% of the population.

There were 6,450 households, out of which 48.0% had children under the age of 18 living with them, 55.0% were married couples living together, 15.5% had a female householder with no husband present, and 23.6% were non-families. 17.4% of all households were made up of individuals, and 5.0% had someone living alone who was 65 years of age or older.  The average household size was 3.06 and the average family size was 3.46.

In the city, the population was spread out, with 34.6% under the age of 18, 11.2% from 18 to 24, 31.3% from 25 to 44, 16.6% from 45 to 64, and 6.3% who were 65 years of age or older.  The median age was 28 years. For every 100 females, there were 98.2 males.  For every 100 females age 18 and over, there were 95.5 males.

At the time of the 2010 census, the median income for a household in the city was $40,314, and the median income for a family was $44,006. Males had a median income of $34,726 versus $25,759 for females. The per capita income for the city was $15,876.  About 11.4% of families and 13.4% of the population were below the poverty line, including 18.2% of those under age 18 and 11.3% of those age 65 or over.  The estimated unemployment rate in November 2016 was 8.3%.

Economy
Major employers in Lemoore include Naval Air Station Lemoore, Tachi Palace, Leprino Foods and Olam International.

Government
Lemoore is incorporated as a general law city under the California Constitution. The city has a council-manager government with a city manager appointed by the city council.  The city council is made up of five members. The mayor and mayor pro tem are elected by the city council from among its members. On December 6, 2022, the city council elected Patricia Matthews as mayor.  Other city council members are Frank Gornick, Jim Chaney, David Orth and Stuart Lyons.  Lemoore's city manager is Nathan Olson.

State and federal representation

In the United States House of Representatives, Lemoore is in California's 21st District and is represented by Republican David Valadao.

Education
The Lemoore Union Elementary School District provides kindergarten through eighth grade education for most of the city.  It operates the following elementary and junior high schools:

Cinnamon Elementary
P.W. Engvall Elementary
Lemoore Elementary
Meadow Lane Elementary
Liberty Middle School
University Charter School

The Central Union School District serves much of the outlying parts of the Lemoore area beyond the city limits and provides kindergarten through eighth grade education. It operates the following elementary schools:
Akers Elementary at NAS Lemoore
Neutra Elementary at NAS Lemoore that was designed by the renowned architect Richard J. Neutra
Central Union Elementary School
Stratford Elementary School

The Island Union Elementary School District serves the Island District northwest of Lemoore and operates Island Elementary School which has grades kindergarten through eighth.

The Lemoore Union High School District provides public secondary education. It operates the following schools:

Lemoore Union High School
Donald C. Jamison High School
Lemoore Middle College High School
Gundacker Community Day School
Yokuts High School at the Santa Rosa Rancheria

West Hills College Lemoore is a community college in Lemoore.

Private Schools in Lemoore include:

Kings Christian School - pre-kindergarten through high school.
Mary Immaculate Queen School - kindergarten through eighth grade.

Media
The city formerly had a local paper called The Lemoore Advance'' and the Advance Extra, which is now defunct.

KGAR, 93.3 FM, is a low-power FM radio station operated by Lemoore High School students on the campus of Lemoore High School.

Notable people
David Ausberry, professional football player for the Oakland Raiders
Astronaut Michael A Baker, retired captain in the United States Navy, former NASA astronaut, and the International Space Station Program Manager for International and Crew Operations, at NASA's Johnson Space Center. Graduated from Lemoore Union High School, Lemoore, California, in 1971; received a bachelor of science degree in aerospace engineering from the University of Texas in 1975.
Eric Fox, former outfielder for the Oakland Athletics
Former NFL fullback Lorenzo Neal, played for Lemoore High School and California State University, Fresno. Neal was a state champion wrestler as a heavyweight for Lemoore High School as well.
Chris Pendleton, folkstyle and freestyle wrestler, two-time NCAA National Wrestling Champion and three-time All-American
Rock musician and Journey leader Steve Perry, moved to Lemoore from Hanford as a teenager and began developing his craft while attending high school there.
Daniel Rhoads, a California pioneer and rancher who helped rescue the Donner Party. El Adobe de los Robles Rancho (California Historical Landmark #206), a building built by Rhoads, can be found north of Lemoore along state highway 41.
Sprinter Tommie Smith, ran high school track at Lemoore High School before setting a world record in the 200 m at the 1968 Summer Olympics in Mexico City.  Smith, along with his teammate John Carlos, is best known for his Black Power salute during the medal ceremony.
Zilpha Keatley Snyder, noted author of books for children and young adults, was born in Lemoore.  She wrote 43 books in her lifetime, including three Newbery Honor books.

Notes

References

External links

Lemoore Health Center
Sarah A. Mooney Memorial Museum

 
Cities in Kings County, California
San Joaquin Valley
1900 establishments in California
Populated places established in 1900
Incorporated cities and towns in California